The 2021-22 Italian football winter transfer window runs from 3 to 31 January 2022. This list includes transfers featuring at least one club from either Serie A or Serie B that were completed after the end of the summer 2021 transfer window on 30 September 2021 and before the end of the winter 2021-22 window on 31 January.

Transfers
Legend
Those clubs in Italic indicate that the player already left the team on loan on this or the previous season or a new signing that immediately left the club.

Footnotes

References

2021–22 in Italian football
Italy
2021